The American Helvetia Philatelic Society (AHPS) is a philatelic organization dedicated to being the "source of information and material on the stamps, postal history and philatelic literature of Helvetia." It is an affiliate of the American Philatelic Society and the Union of Swiss Philatelic Societies.

History
The society was founded in 1938 when it was founded by six Swiss and three Americans. It was then called Society for Collectors of Switzerland and was located in Philadelphia, Pennsylvania. In 1975 it took on its current form and was renamed the American Helvetia Philatelic Society.

Services
The AHPS is based in the United States, but has members in various countries. It provides for philatelic exhibitions, slide slows, auctions, sales books, research groups, and other activities.

Tell
The journal Tell is published bi-monthly by the society.

Organization
The society operates under a set of by-laws, and is administered by a president, vice president, secretary, treasurer and other board officers.

See also
 Postage stamps and postal history of Switzerland

External links
 American Helvetia Philatelic Society
 Helvetia Publishes Booklet Guide to Swiss Stamps
 Tell
 AHPS Directory
 Pdb Directory - American Helvetia Philatelic Society

Philatelic organizations based in the United States
Philately of Switzerland